Dutchtown and Dutch Town may refer to a place in the United States:

Dutchtown, Colorado, a ghost town listed on the NRHP in Colorado
Dutchtown, Louisiana, an unincorporated community
Dutchtown, Missouri, a village in Cape Girardeau County
Dutchtown, Atlantic County, New Jersey, an unincorporated community
Dutchtown, Somerset County, New Jersey, an unincorporated community
Dutchtown, New York, a hamlet in Erie County
Dutch Town, West Virginia
Dutchtown, St. Louis, Missouri, a neighborhood

See also
Deutschtown, Pittsburgh, Pennsylvania, a neighborhood